Crime comics is a genre of American comic books and format of crime fiction. The genre was originally popular in the late 1940s and early 1950s and is marked by a moralistic editorial tone and graphic depictions of violence and criminal activity. Crime comics began in 1942 with the publication of Crime Does Not Pay published by Lev Gleason Publications and edited by Charles Biro. As sales for superhero comic books declined in the years after World War II, other publishers began to emulate the popular format, content and subject matter of Crime Does Not Pay, leading to a deluge of crime-themed comics. Crime and horror comics, especially those published by EC Comics, came under official scrutiny in the late 1940s and early 1950s, leading to legislation in Canada and Great Britain, the creation in the United States of the Comics Magazine Association of America and the imposition of the Comics Code Authority in 1954. This code placed limits on the degree and kind of criminal activity that could be depicted in American comic books, effectively sounding the death knell for crime comics and their adult themes.

Precursors
Although petty thieves, grifters, and outright crooks have existed in American comic books and strips since their inception, books and strips actually devoted to criminals and criminal activity are relatively rare. The comic strip Dick Tracy was perhaps the first to focus on the character and plots of a vast array of gangsters. Chester Gould's strip, begun in 1931, made effective use of grotesque villains, actual police methods, and shocking depictions of violence. Dick Tracy inspired many features starring a variety of police, detectives, and lawyers but the most memorable devices of the strip would not be featured as prominently until the publication of Crime Does Not Pay in 1942.

Crime Does Not Pay

As edited and mostly written by Charles Biro (with Bob Wood), Crime Does Not Pay was a 64-page (later 52-page) anthology comic book published by Lev Gleason Publications beginning in 1942 and running for 147 issues until 1955. Each issue of the series featured several stories about the lives of actual criminals taken from newspaper accounts, history books, and occasionally, as advertised, "actual police files." The stories provided details of actual criminal activity and, in making the protagonists of the stories actual criminals — albeit criminals who were eventually caught and punished, usually in a violent manner, by story's end — seemed to glorify criminal activity, according to several critics. An immediate success, the series remained virtually unchallenged in the field of non-fiction comic books for several years until the post-World War II decline in other genres of comic books, including superhero comic books, made it more viable to publish new genres.

Other titles and series
Beginning in 1947, publishers began issuing new titles in the crime comics genre, sometimes changing the direction of existing series but often creating new books whole cloth. Many of these titles were direct imitations of the format and content of Crime Does Not Pay.

In May, 1947, Arthur Bernhard's Magazine Village company published True Crime Comics, designed and edited by Jack Cole. The first issue (#2) featured Cole's "Murder, Morphine, and Me", the story of a young female drug addict who became involved with gangsters. The story would become one of the most controversial of the period and samples of the art, including a panel from a dream sequence in which the heroine has her eye held open and threatened with a hypodermic needle, would be used in articles and books (like Geoffrey Wagner's Parade of Pleasure) about the pernicious influence and obscene imagery of crime comics.

Later in 1947, the team of Joe Simon and Jack Kirby began packaging a pair of crime comics for the Prize Comics line. Headline Comics (with a cover date of March) was transformed from adventure to a crime theme. Published with a date of October/November, Justice Traps the Guilty was a full-fledged crime comic from the onset, and besides Simon and Kirby, featured art by Marvin Stein, Mort Meskin, and John Severin. At the same time, Simon and Kirby revitalized Real Clue Comics for Hillman Comics, giving the title a true-crime veneer and transforming it from a serial character-driven mystery title.

EC Comics began publishing Crime SuspenStories in 1950 and Shock SuspenStories in 1952. Both titles featured, in the manner of the EC horror comics, fictional noir-style stories of murder and revenge with stunning art and tightly plotted twist-endings.

Backlash

Growing opposition to crime comics

In the late 1940s, the comic book industry became the target of mounting public criticism for their content and their potentially harmful effects on children. In some communities, children piled their comic books in schoolyards and set them ablaze after being egged-on by moralizing parents, teachers, and clergymen. In 1948, John Mason Brown of the Saturday Review of Literature described comics as the "marijuana of the nursery; the bane of the bassinet; the horror of the house; the curse of kids, and a threat to the future." The same year, after two articles by Dr. Fredric Wertham put comic books through the wringer, an industry trade group, the Association of Comics Magazine Publishers (ACMP) was formed but proved ineffective.

Criminalisation of crime comics in Canada
In 1949, spearheaded by the campaigning of MP Davie Fulton, crime comics were banned in Canada in Bill 10 of the 21st Canadian Parliament's 1st session (informally known as the Fulton Bill). The Criminal Code defined crime comics as a magazine, periodical or book that exclusively or substantially comprises matter depicting pictorially (a) the commission of crimes, real or fictitious; or (b) events connected with the commission of crimes, real or fictitious, whether occurring before or after the commission of the crime and made it an offence to produce, publish or distribute them. The provisions remained in the Criminal Code until December 2018 when Bill C-51 was adopted during the 42nd Canadian Parliament. Previously, crime comics also could be ordered forfeited by the provincial courts.

Seduction of the Innocent
In 1954, Wertham once again brought his wrath to bear upon comic books. In Seduction of the Innocent, he warned that "crime comics" were a serious cause of juvenile delinquency, citing overt or covert depictions of violence, sex, drug use, and other adult fare. Wertham asserted, largely based on undocumented anecdotes, that reading this material encouraged similar behavior in children. Many of his other conjectures, particularly about hidden sexual themes (e.g. images of female nudity concealed in drawings of muscles and tree bark, or Batman and Robin as homosexual partners), were met with derision within the comics industry. His claim that Wonder Woman had a bondage subtext was somewhat better documented, as her creator William Moulton Marston had admitted as much; however, Wertham also claimed Wonder Woman's strength and independence made her a lesbian (she is traditionally portrayed as a heterosexual and a virgin) . Seduction of the Innocent created alarm in parents and galvanized them to campaign for censorship.

Senate Subcommittee on Juvenile Delinquency
Public criticism brought matters to a head. In April and June 1954, the Senate Subcommittee on Juvenile Delinquency conducted investigations led by anti-crime crusader Estes Kefauver. The splash made by Wertham's book, and his credentials as an expert witness, made it inevitable that he would appear before the committee. His extensive testimony restated arguments from his book and pointed to comics as a major cause of juvenile crime.

The subcommittee's questioning of publisher William Gaines focused on violent scenes of the type Wertham had decried. When Gaines matter-of-factly contended that he sold only comic books of good taste, Crime Suspenstories, issue 22, April/May 1954, was entered into evidence. Gaines' testimony achieved notoriety for his unapologetic tone and he became a bogeyman for those wishing to censure the product. One exchange became particularly infamous:

Chief Counsel Herbert Beaser: Let me get the limits as far as what you put into your magazine. Is the sole test of what you would put into your magazine whether it sells? Is there any limit you can think of that you would not put in a magazine because you thought a child should not see or read about it?
Bill Gaines: No, I wouldn't say that there is any limit for the reason you outlined. My only limits are the bounds of good taste, what I consider good taste.
Beaser: Then you think a child cannot in any way, in any way, shape, or manner, be hurt by anything that a child reads or sees?
Gaines: I don't believe so.
Beaser: There would be no limit actually to what you put in the magazines?
Gaines: Only within the bounds of good taste.
Beaser: Your own good taste and saleability?
Gaines: Yes.
Senator Estes Kefauver: Here is your May 22 issue. [Kefauver is mistakenly referring to Crime Suspenstories #22, cover date May] This seems to be a man with a bloody axe holding a woman's head up which has been severed from her body. Do you think that is in good taste?
Gaines: Yes sir, I do, for the cover of a horror comic. A cover in bad taste, for example, might be defined as holding the head a little higher so that the neck could be seen dripping blood from it, and moving the body over a little further so that the neck of the body could be seen to be bloody.
Kefauver: You have blood coming out of her mouth.
Gaines: A little.
Kefauver: Here is blood on the axe. I think most adults are shocked by that.

Though the committee's final report did not blame comics for crime, it recommended that the comics industry tone down its content voluntarily.

Decline
In the immediate aftermath of the hearings, several publishers were forced to revamp their schedules and drastically tone down or even cancel many popular long-standing comic series. Gaines called a meeting of his fellow publishers and suggested that they fight outside censorship and help repair the industry's damaged reputation. The Comics Magazine Association of America and its Comics Code Authority was formed. The CCA code was very restrictive and rigorously enforced, with all comics requiring code approval prior to their publication. The CCA had no legal authority over other publishers, but magazine distributors often refused to carry comics without the CCA's seal of approval. Some publishers thrived under these restrictions, others adapted by canceling titles and focusing on Code-approved content, and others went out of business.

Gaines believed that clauses in the code forbidding the words "crime", "horror" and "terror" in comic book titles had been deliberately aimed at his own best-selling titles Crime SuspenStories, The Vault of Horror and The Crypt of Terror. These restrictions, as well as those banning vampires, werewolves and zombies, would make EC Comics unprofitable and Gaines refused to join the association. Gaines ceased publication of several titles on September 14, 1954. The Golden Age of crime comics was effectively over.

Post-Golden Age crime comics
Mystery, crime, and horror stories appeared in a number of anthology titles from various publishers but it was not until the advent of Warren Publishing's Creepy and Eerie in 1964 that the occasional crime story with a modicum of the style or violence that marked the comics of the late 1940s and early 1950s appeared.

Meanwhile, the genre had developed substantially in the hands of European and Japanese creators. In Europe, creators like Vittorio Giardino, Jacques Tardi, José Muñoz, Carlos Sampayo, William Vance and Jean Van Hamme have devoted substantial portions of their oeuvres to crime comics, especially to stories concerned with the trappings of detective fiction and police procedurals, often with a cynical, existentialist bent. Japanese creators like Osamu Tezuka (MW, The Book of Human Insects), Akimi Yoshida (Banana Fish), Takao Saito (Golgo 13), and Kazuo Koike (Crying Freeman) have explored subject matter ranging from the criminal mind to Yakuza gangs in manga form.

American crime comics of the 1970s included Jack Kirby's In the Days of the Mob and Gil Kane's Savage.

In the 1980s, Max Allan Collins and Terry Beatty created the Ms. Tree series about the adventures of a female private investigator. Collins would go on to write the Road to Perdition graphic novels about 1930s gangsters.

Beginning in the late-1980s and 1990s, several American and British comic book writers have created notable work in the crime comics genre, sometimes incorporating noir themes and novelistic storytelling into realistic crime dramas and even into superhero comics. These writers include Brian Azzarello (100 Bullets, Jonny Double), Brian Michael Bendis (Sam and Twitch, Jinx, Powers, Alias), Ed Brubaker (Gotham Central, Criminal), Frank Miller, David Lapham, John Wagner (A History of Violence, Button Man), and Paul Grist.

Notes

References

Goulart, Ron. Great American Comic Books. Publications International, Ltd., 2001. 
Overstreet, Robert M.. Official Overstreet Comic Book Price Guide. House of Collectibles, 2004.

External links
IGN's Guide to Crime & Espionage Genre
Crime Boss: Crime Comics of the 1940s & 50s.
Crime Comics: The Many Colours of Noir by Paul Gravett

 
1942 introductions
Comics
Comics genres